El Hachimia District is a district of Bouïra Province, Algeria.

Municipalities
The district is further divided into 2 municipalities:
El Hachimia
Oued El Berdi 

Districts of Bouïra Province